Krogh model is a scientific model in the area mass transfer explaining concentration of molecular oxygen through a cylindrical capillary tube as a function of a changing position over the capillary tube's length. It was first conceptualized by August Krogh in 1919 to describe oxygen supply in living tissues, particularly the one occurring in human blood vessels.  Its applicability has been extended to various academic fields, and has been successful explaining drug diffusion, water transport, and ice formation in tissues.

Mathematical modeling
Krogh model is derived by applying Fick's laws of diffusion and the law of conservation of mass over a radial interval

Limitations
Although Krogh model is a good approximation, it underestimates oxygen consumption because the cylinder model does not include all the tissue surrounding the capillary.

Notes

References

Diffusion
Scientific models
Mathematics in medicine